Adukkan Entheluppam is a 1986 Indian Malayalam-language film, directed by  Jeassy. The film stars Mammootty, Karthika, Shankar and Jose Prakash in lead roles. The film had musical score by Jerry Amaldev.

Cast

Mammootty as Srinivasan Nair
Shankar as Satheeshan
Karthika as Vimala
Ragini
Jose Prakash as Menon
Sukumari as Bharathi
M. G. Soman as Williams
Mala Aravindan as Markose
Adoor Bhasi as San Diego
Bahadoor as Peter
Valsala Menon as Dr. Jameela
Lalu Alex as Nandakumar
Vincent
Lizzy

Soundtrack
The music was composed by Jerry Amaldev and the lyrics were written by Bichu Thirumala.

References

External links
 

Films directed by Jeassy
1986 films
1980s Malayalam-language films
Films scored by Jerry Amaldev